Plevna Ellis was an Irish association footballer who played as a forward during the 1930s.

Ellis was a part of the Bohemians amateur team of the 1930s. He won seven full international caps for Ireland, making his debut against Switzerland in May 1935 alongside fellow Bohemian Paddy O'Kane.

Honours
Bohemians
League of Ireland: 1933–34, 1935–36
FAI Cup: 1935
League of Ireland Shield: 1934
Dublin City Cup: 1936

References

Living people
Republic of Ireland association footballers
Irish Free State association footballers
Association football forwards
Irish Free State international footballers
League of Ireland players
Bohemian F.C. players
Year of birth missing (living people)